Denis Nzioka is a sexual and gender minority activist-author with a particular focus on LGBTIQ and Sex Workers communities in Kenya and Africa. He has been instrumental in the formation of several organisations focused on queer and sex worker's rights while supporting regional organising around sexual diversity, bodily autonomy and choice-expression.

A pioneer, he ran albeit covertly, Kenya's first safe house for LGBTQ persons in 2009. At the same time, he was the first Kenyan to publicly come out on national TV. Since then, his articles and blogs have been published by various media outlets globally. He has also been making regular TV and radio appearances.

He started the first - and only - LGBTI magazine in Kenya, Identity Kenya, as well as was the first in the continent and globally in 2014, to unveil an LGBTIQ news App on Google Stores. He co-edited Gay Kenya's book 'My Way, Your Way or the Rights Way' and published in 2019 an anthology book of Kenyan allies speaking out for LGBTIQ rights titled “Rafiki Zetu", that is arguably, Africa's first and the world!

He founded the Denis Nzioka News Agency and Service in 2010 as the first-ever exclusive media
agency and service for the LGBTQI, sex work and allied community in Kenya. It works to transform
public opinion and social attitudes through grassroots reporting and community commentary. It provides advocacy and resource materials.

He was named as one of the World's Top 10 Tweeters on Sexuality and Development, in addition to receiving other accolades and awards. He received the 2016 Sauti Award for ‘balanced reporting of sex work issues,’ and to celebrate their 10th anniversary, the South Africa Feathers Awards named him as its 2018 Africa honouree. He received the Munir Mazrui Lifetime Achievement Award by the Defenders Coalition and the Best EA Activist Award in the Tanzania Activist Awards.

Currently, he is undertaking a self-sponsored research project “Waiter, umenyonga ugali: LGBTI rights and Human Rights”. He attempts to answer the question, ‘Are LGBTIQ rights part of the Kenya civil society menu?’ He hopes to investigate how – if at all – civil society's organisations in Kenya are integrating the rights of sexual and gender minorities in their advocacy strategies and social change programs.

He unveiled, in 2020, the Gay and Lesbian Archives of Kenya, dubbed KumbuKumbu, an open, online, and free repository for records documenting the history and culture of the LGBTIQ movement in Kenya from mid-1800 to present.

Openly gay, Denis Nzioka is also a parent. He is based in Nairobi, Kenya.

Nzioka, who is openly gay, was a 2013 Kenyan Presidential candidate.

Publications as editor

"Rafiki Zeru: Kenyan LGBTIQ Stories, as told, by Allies" Nairobi, 2019
My Way, Your Way, or the Rights Way. Nairobi: Storymoja, 2011.

See also
LGBT rights in Kenya

References

External links
'Interview with Denis Nzioka: LGBT Rights Activist, 2012', a24media
https://www.gaystarnews.com/article/kenyan-lgbti-stories-rafiki-zetu/  'Kenyan gay man wants to change minds with new collection of LGBTI stories'

Living people
1985 births
People from Nairobi
Kenyan LGBT writers
Kenyan activists
Kenyan journalists
21st-century LGBT people